Uvira is a city in the South Kivu Province of the Democratic Republic of Congo. Uvira is a Roman Catholic diocese, a suffragan of the archdiocese of Bukavu.

Geography 
It is located at the extreme north end of Lake Tanganyika. Kalundu is a lake port at the southern end of the town, which provides links by boat to Kalemie in Katanga Province, Kigoma in Tanzania, Pulungu in Zambia and Bujumbura (the largest city and former capital of Burundi).

The town is linked by road to Bukavu (the capital of the South Kivu province), and Bujumbura. The town is 120 km from Bukavu and 60 km from the territory of Fizi. 

Uvira is also linked by road to:

 Bujumbura, the former capital of Burundi (25 km)
 The territory of Fizi (60 km)
 Rwanda via Kamanyola border (80 km)
 Bukavu, the capital of the South Kivu province (120 km)
 Kalemie in Katanga Province (385 km)

Uvira Mental Health Center will serve primarily residents in territory of Uvira, territory of Fizi and Territory of Walungu (kamanyola), although individuals living outside the region may also receive care.

History
Uvira was the former capital of South Kivu Subregion, which was part of the Kivu region during the Mobutu era. Following the creation of South Kivu as a province, the capital transferred to Bukavu.

In 2017, the CNPSC rebel group launched an attack on the city, which was repelled by the national army and MONUSCO forces.

See also
AS Maïka

Further reading

External links
 
 Map

References 

 
Populated places in South Kivu
Lake Tanganyika